Contemporary Linguistics: An Introduction is a 1987 textbook edited by William O'Grady, Francis Katamba, John Archibald, Mark Aronoff, Janie Rees-Miller, Michael Dobrovolsky in which the authors provide an introduction to linguistics.

Reception
The book was reviewed by Charles H. Ulrich, Stephen Adewole, Catherine Rudin and Laurel J. Brinton.

References

External links 
 Contemporary Linguistics: An Introduction

1987 non-fiction books
Linguistics textbooks
Edited volumes
St. Martin's Press books